The Yearbook is the fifth studio album by rapper KJ-52.

The Special Edition DVD includes a Making Of documentary and the five videos he made released before the release of The Yearbook, including KJ-52, Behind the Musik, Life After Death, I Can Call On You, and Revenge of the Nerds.

The song "Wake Up" peaked at #13 on ChristianRock.net.

"You're Gonna Make It" was featured on the CBS crime drama Cold Case in the episode "It Takes a Village."

"Do Yo Thang" and "Fanmail" both have music videos available on KJ's site.

Track listing

Awards

In 2008, the album was nominated for a Dove Award for Rap/Hip-Hop Album of the Year at the 39th GMA Dove Awards. The song "Wake Up" was also nominated for Rap/Hip-Hop Recorded Song of the Year.

References

KJ-52 albums
2007 albums